Everaldo Begines Villarreal (born 12 July 1971) is a Mexican former professional football manager and player.

External links

1971 births
Living people
Mexican footballers
Association football forwards
C.D. Guadalajara footballers
Santos Laguna footballers
Atlético Morelia players
Club León footballers
Cruz Azul footballers
Club Celaya footballers
Querétaro F.C. footballers
Irapuato F.C. footballers
Dorados de Sinaloa footballers
Club Tijuana footballers
Salamanca F.C. footballers
Tampico Madero F.C. footballers
Liga MX players
Ascenso MX players
Mexican football managers
Liga MX Femenil managers
Footballers from Tamaulipas
Sportspeople from Nuevo Laredo